The insurrection of 12 Germinal Year III was a popular revolt in Paris on 1 April 1795 against the policies of the Thermidorian Convention. It was provoked by poverty and hunger resulting from the abandonment of the controlled economy after dismantling of the Revolutionary Government during Thermidorian Reaction.

Causes 
The abandonment of the controlled economy provoked a frightful economic catastrophe. Prices soared and the rate of exchange fell. The Republic was condemned to massive inflation and its currency was ruined. In Thermidor, Year III, assignats were worth less than 3 percent of their face value. Neither peasants nor merchants would accept anything but cash. The debacle was so swift that economic life seemed to come to standstill.

The insurmountable obstacles raised by the premature reestablishment of economic freedom reduced the government to a state of extreme weakness. Lacking resources, it became almost incapable of administration, and the crisis generated troubles that nearly brought its collapse. The sans-culottes, who had unprotestingly permitted the Jacobins to be proscribed, began to regret the regime of the Year II, now that they themselves were without work and without bread. The Thermidorians accused the Montagnards of pushing them to revolt in desperation. 
  
On 17 March a delegation from faubourgs Saint-Marceau and Saint-Jacques complained that: «We are on the verge of regretting all the sacrifices that we have made for the Revolution». Police law was passed which lay down the death penalty for use of seditious language. Arms were distributed to the "good citizens", the faithful nucleus of the National Guard.

The insurrection 

On 12 Germinal (1 April), the session of the Convention was interrupted by a crowd which invaded the chamber with cries of "Bread! Bread!" and created a prolong uproar. Vanheck, at the head of the Cité Section, imposed silence and demanded the application of the Constitution of 1793, measures to deal with the shortage of food, and the release of the imprisoned patriots. The demonstration finally allowed themselves to be persuaded, by the Montagnards themselves, to march past the bar and evacuate the chamber. In point of fact, it is impossible to talk of an insurrection organized by the sections; two of them, indeed, in respectful address, expressed themselves to the same effect as the Thermidorians. It is therefore obvious that the movement had no leaders worthy of the name, and that the agitators, launching forth into speeches, had been unable to reconstruct the bands which in the past had insured the success of the journees. The demonstrators were unarmed; they had repulsed the jeunesse doree easily, but when the National Guards of the western sections, led by Merlin de Thionville, appeared, they withdrew without offering any resistance. However, the city was seriously disturbed; the Pantheon and Cité sections declared themselves in permanent session; when Auguis and Penieres went to their headquarters, the former was arrested and wounded; a shot was fired at the latter. On the thirteenth, the agitation continued at the Quinze-Vingts.In the preceding night, the Convention had placed Paris under martial law and given command of the city to Pichegru, who happened to be there at the time, detailing Merlin de Thionville and Barras to assist him.

Reaction  

The main consequence of the insurrection was to accelerate still further the political reaction. The Assembly immediately voted the deportation of Collot, Billaud, and Barere to Guiana. Eight prominent Montagnards were arrested including Amar, Leonard Bourdon, Cambon, René Levasseur, Maignet, Lecointre and Thuriot, who had been early leaders of the thermidorian reaction, was an indication of the extent to which the Assembly was now bent on undoing the past. The main weight of repression fell on the sans-culottes. A state of siege was declared in Paris and many of the germinal leaders were arrested. Under pressure from the Sections, the Assembly, on 10 April, ordered the disarming, in Paris and the provinces, of all who had played a leading part in Terror. It is estimated that only in Paris about 1,600 sans-culottes were affected by the measure. In the provinces the decree of 10 April was often the signal for the arrest and prosecution of former terrorists. In Lyons and the south-east it probably helped to set off the prison massacres for which it designated the victims.

References

Sources

External links 
 

1795 events of the French Revolution
Military coups in France
18th-century coups d'état and coup attempts
Insurgencies in Paris